Lethrinops macracanthus is a species of cichlid endemic to Lake Malawi where it occurs in deep waters over sandy substrates.  This species grows to a length of  TL.

References

macracanthus
Fish of Lake Malawi
Fish of Malawi
Fish described in 1931
Taxa named by Ethelwynn Trewavas
Taxonomy articles created by Polbot